The Journal of Mathematical Physics, Analysis, Geometry is a quarterly peer-reviewed scientific journal covering mathematics as applied to physics. It is published by the Verkin Institute for Low Temperature Physics and Engineering and was established in 1994 as Mathematical Physics, Analysis, Geometry. Papers are published in English, Ukrainian, and Russian. The journal is abstracted and indexed by Scopus. According to the Journal Citation Reports, the journal has a 2017 impact factor of 0.531.

Editors-in-chief
The following persons are or have been editors-in-chief:
 Vladimir Marchenko: 1994—1999
 Iossif Ostrovskii: 2000—2004
 Leonid Pastur: 2005—present

History
Publication was suspended in 1960, but in 1965 due to the efforts of Naum Akhiezer the journals Theory of functions, functional analysis and their applications, and Ukrainian Geometric Collection» were established. In 1994, these journals were merged by the Mathematical Division of the Verkin Institute to establish the current journal. The first editor was Vladimir Marchenko.

References

External links

Mathematics journals
Academic journals published in Ukraine
Quarterly journals
Publications established in 1994
Multilingual journals